American Hospital Association v. Becerra, 596 U.S. ___ (2022), was a United States Supreme Court case relating to administrative law. The case centered on a rule from the Department of Health and Human Services, which reduced reimbursement rates for certain hospitals. Several hospital associations and hospitals affected by the rule sued HHS, alleging that it exceeded its statutory authority. The court was tasked with deciding if the rule was a reasonable interpretation of the law, and if the statute blocked judicial review of the rule in the first place.

Background

Rule in question 

The rule challenged dealt with 340B hospitals and Medicare Part B insured patients. Previously, the government reimbursed hospitals at a uniform rate if they provided outpatient care to Medicare Part B recipients. HHS then changed the rule to reduce reimbursement rates for 340B hospitals, because they could get drugs at lower costs.

Lower court decisions 

The United States District Court for the District of Columbia initially found in favor of the American Hospital Association (AHA), stating the government exceeded its statutory authority. The United States Court of Appeals for the District of Columbia Circuit reversed, finding that the rule was a reasonable interpretation of the law, and applied deference under Chevron U.S.A., Inc. v. Natural Resources Defense Council, Inc.. On March 15, 2021, the AHA filed a petition for a writ of certiorari.

Supreme Court 

The Supreme Court granted certiorari on July 2, 2021, adding a question presented of whether the courts had jurisdiction to consider the challenge to the rule. It heard oral arguments on November 30, 2021. On June 15, 2022, the Supreme Court reversed the D.C. Circuit in a 9–0 decision, written by Justice Brett Kavanaugh. 

The court ruled that the statute does not give the Department of Health and Human Services the authority or the discretion to vary the reimbursement rates for 340B hospitals.

Many legal experts considered the case to have significant consequences for the future of Chevron deference, and although the precedent was discussed extensively during oral arguments, the opinion did not mention it even once.

References

External links 
 

2022 in United States case law
United States Supreme Court cases
United States Supreme Court cases of the Roberts Court
United States administrative case law